Back Numbers is the second album by Dean & Britta, released in 2007.

Track listing 
All tracks by Dean & Britta except where noted.

 "Singer Sing" – 4:15
 "Words You Used to Say" – 4:21
 "Wait for Me" – 3:40
 "You Turned My Head Around" (Lee Hazlewood) – 3:34
 "Teen Angel" (Donovan) – 3:21
 "White Horses" (Carr, Nisbet) – 5:12
 "Me & My Babies" – 3:29
 "Say Goodnight" – 3:52
 "Crystal Blue R.I.P." – 3:37
 "The Sun Is Still Sunny" – 4:26
 "Our Love Will Still Be There" (The Troggs) – 4:22

Personnel 

Richard Agerbeek – design
Matt Johnson – drums
Michael Lavine – photography
Emily Lazar – mastering
Sean McCaul – vibraphone
Britta Phillips – bass, keyboards, vocals, engineer
Tony Visconti – producer, engineer, double bass, mixing, 12-string guitar
Dean Wareham – guitar, vocals
David Whitehead – management

References

2007 albums
Dean & Britta albums
Albums produced by Tony Visconti
Rounder Records albums